Red Garland at the Prelude is a live album by American pianist, composer and bandleader Red Garland which was recorded in 1959 and released on the Prestige label. The album was recorded at the Prelude Club at the same concert that produced Lil' Darlin' and Red Garland Live!.

A significantly expanded version of this album was reissued in 2006 as a 2-CD set, incorporating tracks from the albums Lil' Darlin', Red Garland Live! and Satin Doll as well as four previously unissued tracks.

Reception

The Allmusic review by Scott Yanow stated: "Straight-ahead jazz fans should get this one". C. Michael Bailey from All About Jazz stated: "There may be an argument that The Red Garland Trio at the Prelude is the last of the great Garland Trio recordings. The pianist performed and recorded sporadically until his death at 61 years old in 1984. But it is these Prelude sides illustrate Red Garland at top form in his craft".

Track listing
 "Satin Doll" (Duke Ellington, Johnny Mercer, Billy Strayhorn) - 6:21  
 "Perdido" (Ervin Drake, Juan Tizol) - 4:36  
 "There Will Never Be Another You" (Mack Gordon, Harry Warren) - 6:43  
 "Bye Bye Blackbird" (Mort Dixon, Ray Henderson) - 5:05  
 "Let Me See" (Count Basie, Harry "Sweets" Edison, Jon Hendricks) - 5:57  
 "Prelude Blues" (Red Garland) - 5:41  
 "Just Squeeze Me (But Don't Tease Me)" (Ellington, Lee Gaines) - 5:41  
 "One O'Clock Jump" (Basie, Eddie Durham) - 3:24  
Recorded The Prelude Club in New York City on October 2, 1959

Personnel
Red Garland - piano
Jimmy Rowser - bass
Charles "Specs" Wright - drums

References 

1959 live albums
Prestige Records live albums
Red Garland live albums